The National Commercial Bank Limited, also known as Zhejiang Xingye Bank, was a Chinese bank considered one of the "Three Southern Banks" during nationalist government era. It was merged to Bank of China (Hong Kong) in 2001.

History 
1907: Founded in Hangzhou by Zhejiang Provincial Railway Company.
1908: Opened its Shanghai branch.
1915: Moved headquarters to Shanghai.
1946: Established Hong Kong branches.
1980: Moved headquarters to Beijing.
1989: Became a wholly owned subsidiary of Bank of China Group.
2001: Merged to form Bank of China (Hong Kong).

References

Defunct banks of China
Defunct banks of Hong Kong
Bank of China
Companies based in Zhejiang
Companies based in Shanghai
Companies based in Beijing
Banks disestablished in 2001
Banks established in 1907